Santa Margherita may refer to:

Places in Italy
 Santa Margherita d'Adige, comune in the province of Padova
 Santa Margherita de' Cerchi
 Santa Margherita di Atri, frazione of the comune of Atri, province of Teramo
 Santa Margherita di Belice, comune in the province of Agrigento
 , a frazione of Pula, Sardinia
 Santa Margherita di Staffora, comune in the province of Pavia
 Santa Margherita Ligure, comune in the province of Genova

Churches
 The Cathedral of Santa Margherita or Cattedrale di Santa Margherita, see Montefiascone Cathedral
 The Church of Saint Margaret or Chiesa di Santa Margherita in Brugherio, Italy, see Saint Margaret, Brugherio

See also
 Margaret (disambiguation)
 Santa Margarita (disambiguation)
 Saint Margaret (disambiguation)
 Sainte-Marguerite (disambiguation)
 Society of Saint Margaret, order of women in the Anglican Church
 St Margarets (disambiguation)